Nikolay Filipov (born 14 February 1976) is a former Bulgarian professional footballer who played as a winger. He ended his career at the end of 2007–08 season at age 32.

References

1976 births
Living people
Bulgarian footballers
PFC Cherno More Varna players
PFC Spartak Varna players
PFC Dobrudzha Dobrich players
PFC Rodopa Smolyan players
First Professional Football League (Bulgaria) players
Second Professional Football League (Bulgaria) players
Association football midfielders